i5 was a short-lived American-based girl group whose name stood for "International Five". The group formed in 2000 and disbanded in 2001.

History

2000-2001: Formation, debut album, rising fame and breakup
In 2000, Giant Records, mainly a dance music label, sought to create a girl group to rival other such groups of the time, such as Dream, 3LW, and Eden's Crush. The label's hook for this new group would be that its members were international, to appeal to a larger fan base. Auditions were held, and the five members selected represented five distinct nationalities. Kate Macalino, from the Philippines, had worked as a model in her home country. Tal B. Hajek, from Israel, was a devout Jew who had moved to the US in 1997 and admired rock singers. Christina Rumbley, from the United States, had moved from Florida to Los Angeles to pursue a music career. Andi Murphy McCormack was from the UK and had a passion for dancing. Gaby Equiz, from Mexico, dreamed of fame. Together, these girls became the International 5, more commonly referred to as i5.

In the spring of 2000, i5 was featured on the soundtrack to the dance film Center Stage with their song "First Kiss." By the summer of 2000, the girls had almost completed their debut album and began touring with Nickelodeon's All That Music and More tour. On this tour, i5 promoted its single "Distracted," which was written by Steve Kipner, who had previously written hits for Christina Aguilera, Brandy and Dream.

On September 12, 2000, Giant Records released i5's self-titled debut album. The album failed to chart and was a commercial failure due to their label not being able to release any more singles or significantly promote the album because of its imminent folding. Once Giant Records folded, Warner Bros. Records, its parent, absorbed it, and i5 no longer had a label.
Though the members of i5 initially sought a new record label, they failed to find one, and parted ways in late 2001.

Discography

Singles
"Distracted" (2000)

Studio albums
 i5 (2000)

External links

American pop music groups
American pop girl groups
Musical groups established in 2000
Musical groups disestablished in 2001
Giant Records (Warner) artists

•The Group was Originally gonna be named 5-starz but changed it because it didn’t sound “catchy”.